Giovanni Benedetto Castiglione (baptized 23 March 16095 May 1664) was an Italian Baroque painter, printmaker and draftsman, of the Genoese school. He is best known now for his etchings, and as the inventor of the printmaking technique of monotyping. He was known as Il Grechetto in Italy and in France as Le Benédette.

Biography
 
Castiglione was born in Genoa. The biographer of Genoese painters, Raffaele Soprani says his parents had him places in the studio of Giovanni Battista Paggi. Wittkower describes him as a "passionate student" of Anthony van Dyck, who arrived in 1621, and Peter Paul Rubens, who stayed in the city in the first decade of the 17th century and whose paintings were readily accessible there. He may have trained under the Genoese Bernardo Strozzi. He lived in Rome from 1634 to about 1645, then returned to Genoa. He also traveled to Florence and Naples. He was back in Rome in 1647, before moving in 1651 to be a court artist in Mantua for Duke Carlo II and his wife Isabella Chiara de Austria. He died in Mantua.

He had various brushes with the law in his lifetime. The Queen's Gallery in London, where an exhibition of his work was held in 2013, made the following statement: "Giovanni Benedetto Castiglione was also a violent and impetuous man, who was repeatedly in court for assault, allegedly attempted to throw his sister off a roof and was forced to leave Rome, probably after committing murder.
The turbulence that characterised his life overshadowed his artistic brilliance, and Castiglione struggled to achieve recognition in his lifetime. Much of what is known about the artist is derived not from fulfilled commissions, but from court documents."

Artistic achievements

He painted portraits, historical pieces and landscapes, but chiefly excelled in fairs, markets and rural scenes with animals. Noah's ark and the animals entering the Ark was a favorite subject of his.

Castiglione was a brilliant draftsman and pioneered the development of the oil sketch (often using a mixture of mediums) as a finished work - previously they had been used only for working studies for another finished piece, for example by Rubens. He returned to the same subjects over and over again, but with significantly different compositions each time.

He also executed a number of etchings (see cover of edition of 
 The genius of Castiglione published in 1648). Diogenes searching for a Man is one of the principal of these; others are about religious themes. Some are moralistic stories such as that of the blind leading the blind. The etchings are remarkable for light and shade, and have even earned for Castiglione the name of a second Rembrandt. He was exposed to Rembrandt's etching by 1630. In about 1648 he invented the monotype, the only printmaking technique to be an Italian invention, making over twenty over the succeeding years.  His most popular and influential prints were a series of exotic heads, mostly of vaguely Oriental males, but also of women.  These were produced in great numbers. Among the topics of his etchings are Diogenes with his lantern, Noah leading animals into Arc,
St Joseph Asleep during Flight from Egypt, Circe surrounded by animals, Silenus at the fountain, Nativity, Resurrection of Lazarus, and Genius of Castiglione.

Castiglione was renowned for his ability to paint animals, mostly barn animals, and this was often a dominant motif in his paintings. For example, in the painting of Jesus clearing the temple of Moneylenders, the religious event is a minor, background part of the painting, the stampede of animals is far more prominent than the scattering of bankers.  Castiglione's attention to detail in the depiction of nature is regarded as proof of the influence of Scorza and the Flemish still life and animal painter Jan Roos who was a long-term resident of Genoa. It has been suggested that it was Jan Roos who convinced Castiglione to enliven his religious and mythological compositions with animal and still life elements.

In Mantua, he received his name of Grechetto, from the classic air of his pastoral depictions. In his later years, he was severely afflicted by gout. His brother Salvatore and his son Francesco excelled in the same subjects; and it is thought that many paintings which are ascribed to Benedetto are only copies after him, or perhaps originals by his son or brother. He also influenced Anton Maria Vassallo (c1640-60). Among those who engraved after him were Giovanni Lorenzo Bertolotto in Genoa, the Venetian Anton Maria Zanetti, Michele l'Asne, Louis de Chatillon, and Coreneille Coemans.

His paintings are to be found in Rome, Venice, Naples, Florence, and more especially Genoa and Mantua. The Presepio (Nativity of Jesus) for the church of San Luca, Genoa, ranks among his most celebrated paintings, and the Louvre contains eight characteristic examples. He painted a SS. Mary Magdalene and Catharine for the church of the Madonna di Castello and St. James defeats the Moors'' for the Oratorio di San Giacomo della Marina, both in Genoa.

Gallery

Notes

Sources

External links

Gallery of etchings
Genoa : drawings and prints, 1530-1800, fully digitized text from The Metropolitan Museum of Art libraries (see index)

1609 births
1664 deaths
Artists from Genoa
17th-century Italian painters
Italian male painters
Italian painters of animals
Italian Baroque painters
Italian draughtsmen
Italian printmakers